T. Trivikrama Rao was an Indian film producer predominantly worked in Telugu cinema. He produced more than 20 film under the banner, Vijayalakshmi Art Pictures.

Early life 
Trivikrama Rao was born in Palakonda of Srikakulam district in Andhra Pradesh. He had three daughters and a son.

Filmography 
He made successful films with lead actors like N.T.R, Krishna, Krishnam Raju, Chiranjeevi, Nandamuri Balakrishna. He introduced director Puri Jagannadh to the Telugu film industry.

Death 
Trivikrama Rao died because of cardiac arrest on 3 December 2008 in a private hospital in Hyderabad.

References 

Telugu film producers
2008 deaths
Film producers from Andhra Pradesh
People from Srikakulam district